Mulga Island is a small island  off the coast and  northeast of Kirkby Head, Enderby Land in Antarctica. Plotted from air photos taken from ANARE (Australian National Antarctic Research Expeditions) aircraft in 1956. Mulga is the vernacular name for species of Acacia found in semi-desert areas of Australia.

See also 
 List of Antarctic and sub-Antarctic islands

Islands of Enderby Land